Fellowsville is an unincorporated community in Preston County, West Virginia, United States.

History
Fellowsville was laid out in 1848. The community was named for Joseph Fellows, the uncle of the founder.

References

Unincorporated communities in Preston County, West Virginia
Unincorporated communities in West Virginia